Mbom Mbom Julien (born 23 April 1984) is a Cameroonian professional association footballer who plays as a midfielder,

Career
His career in Indonesia took him in 2013 from Mitra Kukar F.C. to Persika Karawang.

On 29 March 2014, Mbom signed a deal with 2014 Liga Indonesia Super League clubs side Persis Solo for a one-year contract and the same year he moved to Monrovia Club Breweries FC in the 2014 Liberia League.

References

Living people
1984 births
Association football midfielders
Cameroonian footballers
Mitra Kukar players
Persema Malang players
Pelita Jaya FC players
Valenciennes FC players
Dijon FCO players
Cameroonian expatriate footballers
Cameroonian expatriate sportspeople in Indonesia
Expatriate footballers in Indonesia